Simencourt is a commune in the Pas-de-Calais department in the Hauts-de-France region of France.

Geography

Population

Places of interest
 An eighteenth-century manor house.
 The church of St. Médard, dating from the sixteenth century.
 Scene of fighting in 1918 by 9th Battalion (North Irish Horse) Royal Irish Fusiliers.

See also
 Communes of the Pas-de-Calais department

References

Communes of Pas-de-Calais